Innocent Wendyam Bologo (born 5 September 1989) is a Burkinabé sprinter. He competed in the 100 metres event at the 2013 World Championships in Athletics.

References

External links
 

1989 births
Living people
Burkinabé male sprinters
Place of birth missing (living people)
World Athletics Championships athletes for Burkina Faso
21st-century Burkinabé people